The New Zealand Shipping Company (NZSC) was a shipping company whose ships ran passenger and cargo services between Great Britain and New Zealand between 1873 and 1973.

A group of Christchurch businessmen founded the company in 1873, similar groups formed in the other main centres, to counter the dominance of the Shaw Savill line controlled from London and the (Scotland-Dunedin) Albion line. There were seven initial directors: John Coster, chairman, George Gould Snr., (father of George Gould), John Thomas Peacock, William Reeves, Robert Heaton Rhodes, John Anderson, and Reginald Cobb (died 1873) representing the New Zealand Loan & Mercantile Agency. 

The similar groups of businessmen in Dunedin and Wellington soon joined this Christchurch company followed by the Auckland group. They completed the four-main-centre link in July 1873. Hon. John Johnston Wellington, John Logan Campbell Auckland, and Evan Prosser of Dunedin were elected to the main board. A Captain Ashby opened an office off New Broad Street London and chartered two ships carrying 500 government emigrants: Punjaub 883 tons and Adamant 815 tons set to sail for Canterbury on 31 May and 20 June respectively with full cargo. By November 1873 they had purchased two vessels, Hindostan and Dilfillan and chartered eighteen. Two 1,000 ton ships were scheduled to be launched the same month and named Waikato and Waitangi.

The company gradually established a fleet of vessels, using Māori names for each. From 1875 the livery consisted of black hulls, white superstructure and yellow funnels.

In 1882, the company's ships were equipped with refrigeration. and a frozen meat service began from New Zealand to England.

Company policy dictated a stop at Pitcairn Islands, in the Pacific, to break the monotony of the ocean crossing.

Federal Steam Navigation Company

On 3 January 1912 an agreement was reached whereby the New Zealand Shipping Company absorbed the Federal Steam Navigation Company, which at the time owned ten steamships trading between Australia, New Zealand and the UK. Federal Steam ships retained their house flag, and continued to be named after English counties, thereby retaining their Federal Steam identity. Federal Steam was registered in England for tax purposes, whereas the New Zealand Shipping Company continued to be registered in New Zealand.

World wars
In the First World War the NZSC lost nine ships from a fleet of 32. In the Second World War it lost 19 ships from a fleet of 36.

Closure
The services of both companies were absorbed into the Peninsular and Oriental Steam Navigation Company (P&O) in 1973 after exactly 100 years of service.

Ships
NZSC operated numerous ships, some purpose built, others acquired from other operators by purchase, lease or charter.

House flags

See also
NZ Shipping Co Ltd v A M Satterthwaite & Co Ltd, a leading case on contract law

Isthmian Steamship Company
Owen Cox

References

Bibliography

External links
RMS Rangitata 

 – fleet list

1973 disestablishments in New Zealand
Defunct shipping companies
Defunct transport companies of New Zealand
Shipping companies of New Zealand
New Zealand companies established in 1873
Transport companies established in 1873